Flag of Volyn region is a banner with aspect ratio 2 to 3. In the center on a red (color of ripe cherry) background is an isosceles cross of white (silver) color, touching the ends of the edges of the flag. In the upper left corner is one of the oldest versions of the historical crosses of Volhynia of the 15th to the 18th century centuries (so-called Cross pattée).

The flag is based on the historical traditions of the region and was developed and adopted on the initiative of the chairman of the Volyn Regional Society of Local Historians Gennady Bondarenko.

The flag resembles the flag of Denmark, Dannebrog.

See also 

 Volyn oblast
 Coat of arms of Volyn Oblast

Sources 

 Українське геральдичне товариство
 Офіційний сайт Волинської ОДА
 Гречило А. Сучасні символи областей України. — К., Львів, 2008. — С. 14.

Volyn Oblast
Volyn Oblast
Volyn Oblast